Kuiqi Lu station is the interchange station between Guangfo Line (FMetro Line 1) and FMetro Line 2. Trial construction began in 2003 and the main project in 2005. The station is located under the junction of Kuiqi Road and Fenjiang Road in the Chancheng District of Foshan.

The station is the public transport hub for the Metro, bus services and taxis in Foshan and was completed on 3November 2010. Line 2 started operations on 28 December 2021.

Station layout

Exits

Gallery

References

Foshan Metro stations
Railway stations in China opened in 2010
Guangzhou Metro stations